Michel Strogoff is a 1936 French historical adventure film directed by Jacques de Baroncelli and Richard Eichberg and starring Anton Walbrook, Colette Darfeuil and Armand Bernard. It is an adaptation of the 1876 novel Michael Strogoff by Jules Verne. A separate German version The Czar's Courier was also made.

The film's sets were designed by the art director Alexandre Lochakoff. It was made by the French subsidiary of Tobis Film and shot at the Epinay Studios in Paris and the Johannisthal Studios in Berlin. Location shooting took place mainly in Bulgaria and at the Johannisthal Air Field.

Cast
Anton Walbrook as Michel Strogoff 
Colette Darfeuil as Sangarre 
Armand Bernard as Harry Blount 
Charles Vanel as Ivan Ogareff 
Yvette Lebon as Nadia Fédor 
Marcelle Worms as Marfa 
Fernand Charpin as Alcide Jolivet 
Victor Vina as Czar 
Camille Bert as Grand Duke
Bernhard Goetzke as Feofar Khan 
René Stern as General Kirsanoff 
Bill Bocket as Wassily

See also
The Soldier and the Lady (1937)

References

External links

1930s historical adventure films
French historical adventure films
Films directed by Jacques de Baroncelli
Films directed by Richard Eichberg
Tobis Film films
Films based on Michael Strogoff
Films set in Russia
Films shot in Bulgaria
Films shot at Epinay Studios
Films shot at Johannisthal Studios
Films set in the 19th century
French multilingual films
French black-and-white films
1936 multilingual films
1930s French films